Saketh Myneni was the defending champion but lost in the second round to Taro Daniel.

Jordan Thompson won the title after defeating Go Soeda 5–7, 7–5, 6–1 in the final.

Seeds

Draw

Finals

Top half

Bottom half

References
 Main Draw
 Qualifying Draw

Vietnam Open (tennis) - Singles